Kisangani Bangoka International Airport  is an airport serving Kisangani, Democratic Republic of the Congo.

Airlines and destinations

Accidents and incidents
 On July 8, 2011, Hewa Bora Airways Flight 952, operated by a Boeing 727, crashed on landing. 74 of the 118 on board died.

See also
Transport in the Democratic Republic of the Congo
List of airports in the Democratic Republic of the Congo

References

External links
Bangoka Airport at OpenStreetMap

Airports in Tshopo
Kisangani